Dave Dahl (born January 12, 1963) is an American entrepreneur, known for co-founding Dave's Killer Bread. Prior to it, he had served a total of over 15 years in prison for multiple offenses including drug distribution, burglary, armed robbery, and assault.

Early life and career
Dave Dahl was born in Portland, Oregon. At the age of 9, Dahl began working at the family bakery which was founded by his father James A. "Jim" Dahl in 1955. Dave often fought with his father because he did not like working there and began smoking cigarettes and using other drugs in his teens. He dropped out of high school in 1980.

In 1987, Dahl was incarcerated for the first time after burglarizing a house. He rejoined the bakery in 1989 after accepting a job offer from his brother Glenn before quitting again and moving to Massachusetts, where he served more time in prison for armed robbery. In 1997, Dahl was arrested again in Portland, Oregon, after which he was incarcerated at the Snake River Correctional Institution near Ontario, Oregon. In 2001, he was placed on a drug treatment program and vocational training in computer-aided drafting and design, which he began to teach other prisoners after excelling at the course. Dahl was released from prison on December 27, 2004, after which he rejoined his brother Glenn at the family bakery for the third time.

While working at the bakery, Dahl came up with a cornmeal-crusted loaf which he and his brother named "Dave's Killer Bread" and formed the basis of the new brand. After initial success at local farmers' markets, stores began carrying the brand's products and by 2013, the company had employed over 300 people (approximately one third of whom were ex-felons) at its headquarters in Milwaukie, Oregon. In August 2015, Dave's Killer Bread was acquired by Flowers Foods for $275 million.

In 2016, Dahl started an organization known as Discover African Art, for which he opened a flagship showroom in Clackamas, Oregon and a boutique in Portland's Pearl District the following year. In June 2017, the organization contributed to grain shipments bound for a village in Mali.

Legal problems
In November 2013, a female friend of Dahl’s called the police to report that he was having a mental health crisis. Upon officers’ arrival, Dahl fled the scene in a black Cadillac Escalade and proceeded to immediately ram two police cars head on. Dahl then fought with officers as they arrested him, sending three officers to the hospital. In October 2014, after being diagnosed with bipolar disorder, Dahl was found guilty except for insanity on two counts of third-degree assault and one count of unlawful use of a weapon by a Washington County judge, who placed him within the jurisdiction of the state's Psychiatric Security Review Board. In January 2015, Dahl was kept on conditional release under the Board's supervision, with requirements including bans on driving and visiting bars.

References

External links
 

Living people
American bakers
American people convicted of assault
American people convicted of drug offenses
1963 births
Businesspeople from Portland, Oregon
American people convicted of burglary
American people convicted of robbery